Moreau Catholic High School is a college preparatory Roman Catholic secondary school sponsored by the Moreau Province of the Congregation of the Holy Cross.  It is located in Hayward, California, within the Roman Catholic Diocese of Oakland under the care of Michael C. Barber, the Bishop of Oakland. It opened in 1965 as an all-boys Catholic High School, temporarily located on the parish grounds of St. Bede's Church.  That same year, construction of the permanent campus began at the current location.  That construction was completed in the spring of 1967.  At the request of Bishop Floyd Begin, Moreau became a coeducational institution in 1969, with the admission of 177 ninth grade girls.  Moreau has twice been named a Blue Ribbon School.

School History 
Moreau Catholic High School opened its doors in 1965 to a class of 103 ninth grade boys. In 1969, as the only Catholic high school serving the Southern Alameda County, the school became co-educational. The high school was constructed with financial and community support from the members of the Diocese of Oakland, the late Bishop Floyd L. Begin and the Brothers of Holy Cross, South-West province. It is the only school to be named after Blessed Basil Moreau.

In addition to its strong commitment to providing young men and women with a quality education that is firmly rooted in the Christian values, Moreau Catholic has twice earned national recognition for academic excellence as a Blue Ribbon School by the United States Department of Education and the Council for American Private education.

Bishop Allen Vigneron and Hayward Mayor Roberta Cooper officiated at the April 30, 2006 groundbreaking ceremony for a multimillion-dollar expansion at Moreau. The project included increasing the school library, adding a state-of-the-art life and physical science laboratory and classroom, and building a film and video arts studio and multi-media classroom.

Academics
Moreau offers more than 40 Honors and AP courses.  Moreau Catholic is accredited by the Western Catholic Educational Association and the Western Association of Schools and Colleges. Moreau Catholic was one of eight schools in California and 54 schools nationwide to be selected as a 2010 Apple Distinguished School.

Some of the courses offered at Moreau Catholic include: AP Biology, AP Chemistry, AP Physics, AP Calculus AB/BC, AP Environmental Science, AP Psychology, AP Chinese, AP Government, and AP Statistics.

Athletics 
Moreau is a member of the Mission Valley Athletic Conference (MVAL), the North Coast Section (NCS), and the California Interscholastic Federation.

Teams include:  Football, Cross Country, Girls Volleyball, Girls Tennis, Girls Golf, Rally Squad, Boys Basketball, Girls Basketball, Boys Soccer, Girls Soccer, Badminton, Baseball, Softball, Track and Field, Swimming, men's and women's Water Polo, Boys Golf, Boys Tennis, and Boys Volleyball. (Girls Basketball won the State Championship in the 1992-1993 season )

Visual and Performing Arts
The school offers courses in choral and instrumental music, dance, theater, and the visual arts, including and Honors Dance Class.

Notable alumni 

 Cindy Chavez, vice mayor of San Jose
 Brian Copeland, author and comedian
 Vanessa Curry, dancer, member of the Pussycat Dolls
 Marco Dapper, actor/model, star of Eating Out 2: Sloppy Seconds
 Rosa Gumataotao Rios, Treasurer of the United States
 Darren Lewis, Major League Baseball player
 Steven J. Lopes, bishop of the Personal Ordinariate of the Chair of Saint Peter
 Joe Trippi, political campaign strategist
 Bryn Davies, musician
 Adam Copeland, Sports Radio Host KNBR, San Francisco <ref>
 Necar Zadegan, actress

References

External links 
 

Holy Cross secondary schools
Catholic secondary schools in California
Roman Catholic Diocese of Oakland
Educational institutions established in 1965
High schools in Alameda County, California
Education in Hayward, California
1965 establishments in California
Buildings and structures in Hayward, California